The Comp Air 10 is a turboprop-powered light civil utility aircraft manufactured in kit form. Very large for a homebuilt aircraft, it is configured as a mainly conventional high-wing monoplane with either taildragger or tricycle undercarriage. Its close-set twin tails are an unusual design feature for an aircraft in its class, intended to ensure that the aircraft can be parked inside standard-size hangars.

A total of eleven examples had been completed and flown by the end of 2011.

The company website does not list it as being in production in 2022.

Specifications (typical Comp Air 10)

See also

References

External links
Official website archives on Archive.org

10
Homebuilt aircraft
1990s United States civil utility aircraft
Single-engined turboprop aircraft
High-wing aircraft